Papua New Guinea is scheduled to participate at the 2018 Summer Youth Olympics in Buenos Aires, Argentina from 6 October to 18 October 2018.

Golf

Papua New Guinea received a quota of two athletes to compete by the tripartite committee.
Individual

Team

Swimming

References

2018 in Papua New Guinean sport
Nations at the 2018 Summer Youth Olympics
Papua New Guinea at the Youth Olympics